Snow Patrol is a Scottish-Northern Irish alternative rock band formed in 1994 in Dundee, Scotland. The band consists of vocalist and rhythm guitarist Gary Lightbody, lead guitarist Nathan Connolly, bassist Paul Wilson, drummer Jonny Quinn and keyboardist Tom Simpson. They have released five studio albums to date, which have been released either by the Jeepster or Fiction/Interscope labels. They have sold more than thirteen million albums worldwide.

Snow Patrol first received the Phil Lynott Best New Band award in 1999 at the Hot Press Awards. They also received one Ivor Novello Album Award for their third album Final Straw in 2005. The band has received seven BMI Awards, two for the song "Run" in 2005: "College Song of the Year" and "BMI Pop Award". The other awards were for the songs "Chasing Cars" and "Hands Open", each winning a BMI Pop Award (twice for Chasing Cars, in 2007 and 2008) and for being performed a combined one million times in the United States in 2007. The band has been particularly successful at the Meteor Music Awards, winning six awards from total seven nominations. These awards were for "Best Irish Band" and "Best Irish Album", in 2005 and 2007, "Best Live Performance", in 2007, and "Most Downloaded Song" for "Chasing Cars", in 2007. They have also received five IFPI Platinum Europe Awards; two for the album Final Straw, in 2004 and 2008 for crossing the two million sales mark in Europe; and the others for the album Eyes Open, in 2006, 2007 and 2009, for crossing the three million sales mark in Europe. Overall, Snow Patrol has received 25 awards from 51 nominations.

BRIT Awards
The Brit Awards are the British Phonographic Industry's annual pop music awards. Snow Patrol has received six nominations.

|-
| rowspan="3" style="text-align:center;"|2005 ||rowspan="2"| Snow Patrol || Best British Group || 
|-
| Best British Rock Act || 
|-
| Final Straw || Best British Album || 
|-
| rowspan="3" style="text-align:center;"|2007 || Snow Patrol || Best British Group || 
|-
| Eyes Open || Best British Album || 
|-
| "Chasing Cars" || Best British Single ||

BMI Awards
The BMI Awards are the Broadcast Music Incorporated's annual music awards. Snow Patrol has received seven awards from seven nominations.

|-
| rowspan="2" style="text-align:center;"|2005 || rowspan="2"|"Run" || BMI College Song of the Year || 
|-
| BMI Pop Award || 
|-
| rowspan="4" style="text-align:center;"|2007 || rowspan="2"|"Chasing Cars" || One Million US Performances || 
|-
| BMI Pop Award || 
|-
| rowspan="2"|"Hands Open" || One Million US Performances || 
|-
| BMI Pop Award || 
|-
| style="text-align:center;"|2008 || "Chasing Cars" || BMI Pop Award ||

Choice Music Prize
The Choice Music Prize is awarded to albums which best sum up the year in Irish music. The award doesn't take in airplay as a criterion, and is awarded solely on the basis of artistic merit. The award is the Irish equivalent of the UK's Mercury Music Prize. Snow Patrol has received one nomination.

|-
| style="text-align:center;"|2006 || Eyes Open || Album of the Year ||

Echo Awards
The Echo Awards is a German music award event which is held annually. Each year's winner is determined by the previous year's sales, Snow Patrol has received three nominations.

|-
| 2007|| Snow Patrol || International Newcomer of the Year || 
|-
| 2008 || Snow Patrol || International Group of the Year || 
|-
| 2012|| Snow Patrol || International Rock/Pop Group ||

Grammy Awards
The Grammy Awards are presented annually by the National Academy of Recording Arts and Sciences of the United States for outstanding achievements in the music industry. Snow Patrol has received one nomination.

|-
| style="text-align:center;"|2007 || "Chasing Cars" || Best Rock Song ||

Hot Press Awards
The Hot Press Awards are annually hosted by the Irish magazine Hot Press. Snow Patrol has received two awards from three nominations.

|-
| style="text-align:center;"|1999 || Snow Patrol || Phil Lynott Award for Best New Band || 
|-
| style="text-align:center;"|2002 || When It's All Over We Still Have to Clear Up || Best Irish Album || 
|-
| style="text-align:center;"|2009 || Snow Patrol || Irish Band of the Decade ||

IFPI Platinum Europe Award
The IFPI Platinum Europe Award is an award given by International Federation of the Phonographic Industry to artists that have sold one million copies of an album in Europe. Snow Patrol has received five awards.

|-
| style="text-align:center;"|2004 || Final Straw || One Million European Sales || 
|-
| style="text-align:center;"|2006 || Eyes Open || One Million European Sales || 
|-
| style="text-align:center;"|2007 || Eyes Open || Two Million European Sales || 
|-
| style="text-align:center;"|2008 || Final Straw || Two Million European Sales || 
|-
| style="text-align:center;"|2009 || Eyes Open || Three Million European Sales ||

International Dance Music Awards
The International Dance Music Awards are annual music awards held at the Winter Music Conference. Snow Patrol has received one nomination.

|-
| style="text-align:center;"|2007 || "Chasing Cars" || Best Alternative/Rock Dance Track ||

Ivor Novello Awards
The Ivor Novello Awards are presented annually by the British Academy of Songwriters, Composers and Authors (BASCA) for excellence in songwriting and composing. Snow Patrol has received one awards from one nomination.

|-
| style="text-align:center;"|2005 || Final Straw || Ivor Novello Album Award ||

NME Awards
The NME Awards are the annual music awards given out by the New Musical Express. Snow Patrol has received one nomination.

|-
| style="text-align:center;"|2005 || Snow Patrol || Best British Band ||

Mercury Prize
The Mercury Prize is an annual music prize awarded for the best album from the United Kingdom or Ireland. The award is the UK equivalent of Ireland's Choice Music Prize. Snow Patrol has received one nomination.

|-
| style="text-align:center;"|2004 || Final Straw || Best Album ||

Meteor Music Awards
The Meteor Music Awards are the national music awards of Ireland. Snow Patrol has received seven awards from been ten nominations.

|-
| style="text-align:center;"|2004 || Snow Patrol || Best Irish Band || 
|-
| rowspan="2" style="text-align:center;"|2005 || Snow Patrol || Best Irish Band || 
|-
| Final Straw || Best Irish Album || 
|-
| rowspan="4" style="text-align:center;"|2007 || Snow Patrol || Best Irish Band || 
|-
| Snow Patrol || Best Live Performance || 
|-
| Eyes Open || Best Irish Album || 
|-
| "Chasing Cars" || Most Downloaded Song || 
|-
| rowspan="3" style="text-align:center;"|2010 || Snow Patrol || Best Irish Band || 
|-
| Snow Patrol || Best Irish Live Performance || 
|-
| Up to Now || Best Irish Album ||

MTV Europe Music Awards
The MTV Europe Music Awards (EMA) are annual music awards to celebrate the most popular music videos in Europe. Snow Patrol has received one nomination.

|-
| 2012 || Snow Patrol || Best World Stage Performance ||

MTV Video Music Awards Japan
The MTV Video Music Awards Japan are annual music awards organised by MTV Japan. Snow Patrol has received one nomination.

|-
| style="text-align:center;"|2008 || "Signal Fire" || Best Video from a Film ||

Q Awards
The Q Awards are the UK's annual music awards run by the music magazine Q. Snow Patrol has received one award from four nominations.

|-
| style="text-align:center;"|2004 || Snow Patrol || Best New Act || 
|-
| rowspan="2" style="text-align:center;"|2006 || Eyes Open || Best Album || 
|-
| "Chasing Cars" || Best Track || 
|-
| style="text-align:center;"|2011 || "Chasing Cars" || Classic Song ||

Silver Clef Awards
The "O2 Silver Clef Lunch" is annually held in aid of Nordoff-Robbins Music Therapy Charity. The event features the Silver Clef Awards. Snow Patrol has received one award from one nomination.

|-
| style="text-align:center;"|2007 || Snow Patrol || Best British Group ||

TEC Awards
The TEC Awards are annually awarded to recognise achievements of audio professionals. They honour the individuals, companies and technical innovations behind the sound of recordings, films, TV shows and live performances. Snow Patrol has received one nomination.

|-
| style="text-align:center;"|2007 || "Chasing Cars" || Record Production/Single or Track ||

UK Festival Awards
The UK Festival Awards is an annual event of UK festival scene which allows festival-goers to set the continuing standard. Snow Patrol has received one award from three nominations.

|-
| style="text-align:center;"|2007 || Snow Patrol || Most Memorable Moment || 
|-
| rowspan="2" style="text-align:center;"|2009 || rowspan="2"|Snow Patrol || Best Headliner – Radio 1's Big Weekend|| 
|-
| Best Headliner – V Festival ||

Heritage Award

In June 2010 the band were commemorated with a Heritage Award by PRS for Music. A plaque was erected on the Duke of York pub in Belfast where the band performed their first gig. The band was only the sixth to receive the award along with the likes of Blur and Elton John. With all the members turning out, they later performed a live set to a small crowd of around 30 people. Quinn described the award as an "honour", and said the plaque meant more to him than other awards that they have received along the way.

Other recognitions

2001 – When It's All Over We Still Have to Clear Up ranked No. 50 in CMJ New Music's Top 75 in August 2001.
2001 – When It's All Over We Still Have to Clear Up ranked No. 6 in the Hot Press Critics Choice Albums in 2001.
2001 – "One Night is Not Enough" listed on the "Highly Recommended" list in the Hot Press Critics Choice Singles in 2001.
2002 – When It's All Over We Still Have to Clear Up ranked No. 6 for Best Album and No. 4 for Best Debut Album categories in the 2002 Hot Press Readers Poll.
2004 – Final Straw nominated to the "Long List" for the 2004 Shortlist Music Prize.
2004 – "Run" ranked No. 22 in NMEs Tracks of the Year.
2006 – "Chasing Cars" ranked #1 in Virgin Radio's Top 500 Songs of All Time.
2006 – "Chasing Cars" ranked No. 49 in Rolling Stone'''s The 100 Best Songs of the Year.
2006 – Final Straw ranked No. 91 in NMEs 100 Best Albums of All Time.
2008 – "Chasing Cars" named one of the Greatest British Songs on 2000s by Q.
2008 – Eyes Open ranked No. 27 in The Irish Times' Top 40 Irish Albums.
2009 – "Run" ranked No. 43 in Xfm's 100 Best British Songs of All Time
2009 – "Chasing Cars" ranked No. 60 in Xfm's 100 Best British Songs of All Time
2009 – Snow Patrol ranked No. 22 in The Irish Times' The Best Irish Acts Right Now.
2009 – "Run" ranked No. 65 in Xfm's Top 100 Songs of All Time.
2009 – "Run" ranked No. 42 in Xfm's Songs of the Decade.
2009 – Snow Patrol ranked No. 10 in Ulster's Top 10 exports. Event appears at 1:35.
2009 – "Chasing Cars" ranked No. 32 in The Sunday Times's Songs of the Noughties (2000s).
2009 – "Run" ranked No. 6 in Absolute Radio's Song of the Decade.
2009 – "Chasing Cars" ranked No. 4 in Absolute Radio's Song of the Decade.
2009 – Eyes Open'' ranked No. 8 in Amazon.co.uk's Best Selling Albums of the Decade.
2009 – Snow Patrol ranked No. 6 in Amazon.co.uk's Best Selling Artists of the Decade.
2009 – "Chasing Cars" named Channel 4's Greatest Song of the Noughties.
2009 – "Chasing Cars" named the Most Played Song of the Decade by music licensing body Phonographic Performance Limited.

References

External links
Snow Patrol official website

Awards
Lists of awards received by British musician
Lists of awards received by musical group